Tutok 13 (pronounced as Tutok Trese / lit. Focus Thirteen) is the flagship national network news program produced and conceptualized by the Intercontinental Broadcasting Corporation's News department, based in the Philippines. Originally anchored by Vincent Gregory Santos, it was premiered on February 25, 2019, coinciding with the network's relaunch, replacing the former news program News Team 13, and airs live daily from 5:00 – 5:30 PM (PST) on IBC, It is also simulcast on Radyo Budyong Panay and official Facebook pages of IBC and Tutok 13. Princess Jordan currently serves as the sole anchor.

The 30-minute revamped news program focuses on delivering the latest national news stories and specialized news packages and feature stories on health, sports, travel, business, science & technology, entertainment, lifestyle, culture and the lighter side of the news. Currently, Tutok 13 is one of two IBC-produced news programs (along with Express Balita).

Anchors
Current
 Princess Jordan (since 2022)
Former
 Vincent Gregory Santos (2019-2020)
 Miguel Dela Rosa (2019)
 Bryan Ellis Castillo  (2019-2022)
 Shawntel Nieto (2022)
 Erica Honrado (2022)
 CK David (2022)

Reporters
 Jess Caduco
 Jinky Baticados
 Princess Jordan
 Zon Ballesteros
 Ralph Lopez
 Patrick Lastra
 JM Pineda

News Writers
 Jenny de Juan
 Divina Dela Torre
 Mary Anne Tolentino

News Digital Team
 Kurt Mustaza
 Veronica Corral
 Ivy Padilla
 Sheena Malquisto

Correspondents
 "Queen Sofia" (Star Chikadora)
 Bingbing Josue (IBC TV-12 Iloilo)
 Rena Manubag-Dagoon (IBC TV-12 Iloilo)
 Robert Nem (IBC DYJJ Roxas)
 Eleanor Defensor-Reyes (IBC DYRG Kalibo)
 Carol Panday-Marku (Britanya Ngayon)

Segments
Current
 Balitang Aprub
 Headlines - top stories news
 Internasyunal - foreign news
 Isport Lang! - sports news
 Provincial Round-Up - regional news
 Star Tracks - showbiz news
 Tutok Express
 Ulat Panahon - weather report
Former
 Adventurista - travel segment with partner travel bloggers
 EntrePinoy - business and economy segment
 Inspirasyon - human interest and inspiring stories
 KKK: Kainan, Kultura, Kaganapan - features (sponsored) segment
 Tuklas Pinoy - Filipino-made inventions / science & technology

References

See also
List of programs broadcast by Intercontinental Broadcasting Corporation

Intercontinental Broadcasting Corporation news shows
IBC News and Public Affairs shows
Intercontinental Broadcasting Corporation original programming
2020s Philippine television series
2019 Philippine television series debuts
Philippine television news shows
Filipino-language television shows
Flagship evening news shows
Television productions suspended due to the COVID-19 pandemic